Victor William Guillemin (born 1937 in Boston) is an American mathematician working in the field of symplectic geometry, who has also made  contributions to the fields of microlocal analysis, spectral theory, and mathematical physics.  He is a tenured Professor in the Department of Mathematics at the Massachusetts Institute of Technology. His uncle Ernst Guillemin was a Professor of Electrical Engineering and Computer Science (EECS) at MIT, and his daughter Karen Guillemin is a Professor of Biology at the University of Oregon.

Professional career
Guillemin received a Ph.D. in mathematics from Harvard University in 1962, after earlier completing his B. A. at Harvard in 1959, as well as an M. A. at the University of Chicago in 1960.  His thesis, entitled Theory of Finite G-Structures, was written under the direction of Shlomo Sternberg.

He is the author or co-author of numerous books and monographs, including a widely used textbook on differential topology, written jointly with Alan Pollack.

Awards and honors
He was elected to the  United States National Academy of Sciences in 1985. In 2003, he was awarded the Leroy P. Steele Prize for Lifetime Achievement by the American Mathematical Society.  In 2012 he became a fellow of the American Mathematical Society.

Selected publications

; reprinted in 1990 as an on-line book

See also
Zoll surface

References

External links

Victor Guillemin's personal web page

Members of the United States National Academy of Sciences
20th-century American mathematicians
21st-century American mathematicians
Differential geometers
Topologists
Massachusetts Institute of Technology School of Science faculty
Harvard College alumni
University of Chicago alumni
Fellows of the American Mathematical Society
Living people
1937 births
Harvard Graduate School of Arts and Sciences alumni